The tog is a measure of thermal insulance of a unit area, also known as thermal resistance. It is commonly used in the textile industry and often seen quoted on, for example, duvets and carpet underlay.

The Shirley Institute in Manchester, England developed the tog as an easy-to-follow alternative to the SI unit of m2⋅K/W. The name comes from the informal word togs for 'clothing', which itself was probably derived from the word toga, a Roman garment. The backronym thermal overall grade is also attested.

The basic unit of insulation coefficient is the RSI, (1 m2⋅K/W). 1 tog = 0.1 RSI. There is also a US clothing unit, the clo, equivalent to 0.155 RSI or 1.55 tog, described in ASTM D-1518.

A tog is 0.1 m2⋅K/W. In other words, the thermal resistance in togs is equal to ten times the temperature difference (in °C) between the two surfaces of a material, when the flow of heat is equal to one watt per square metre.

British duvets are sold in steps of 1.5 tog from 3.0 tog (summer) to 16.5 tog (extra-warm).  The stated values are a minimum; actual values may be up to 3 tog higher. Also, these values assume there is no added duvet cover that can trap air. 

A few manufacturers have marketed combined duvet sets consisting of two duvets; one of approximately 4.5 tog and one of approximately 9.0 tog. These can be used individually as summer (4.5 tog) and spring/autumn (9.0 tog). When joined together using press studs around the edges, or Velcro strips across each of the corners, they become a 13.5 tog winter duvet and as such can be made to suit all seasons.

Testing
Launched in the 1940s by the Shirley Institute, the Shirley Togmeter is the standard apparatus for rating thermal resistance of textiles, commonly known as the Tog Test. This apparatus, described in BS 4745:2005, measures a sample of textile, either between two metal plates (for underclothing) or between a metal plate and free air (for outer layers). Each industry has its own specifications and methods for measuring thermal properties.

See also
 Clothing insulation

References 

Thermodynamics
Textiles
Units of measurement